The 1905 Ole Miss Rebels football team represented the University of Mississippi during the 1905 Southern Intercollegiate Athletic Association football season. The team had no coach and did not score a point, losing to Cumberland and in the Egg Bowl.

Schedule

References

Ole Miss
Ole Miss Rebels football seasons
College football winless seasons
Ole Miss Rebels football